The Frederick K. Stearns House is a historic inn located at 8109 East Jefferson Avenue in Detroit, Michigan, directly adjacent to the Arthur M. Parker House. It was listed on the National Register of Historic Places in 1985.

Description
The Frederick K. Stearns House is a two-and-one-half-story house constructed from hollow tile. It has a gabled roof and stuccoed, half timber façades. The medieval feel of the house is accentuated through the use of varied window sizes, and by several projecting bays and broad roof surfaces.

Significance
This house was built for Frederick K. Stearns, son of the founder of a pharmaceutical firm that built the Frederick Stearns Building, also located on Jefferson Avenue, and who served as its president from 1887 to 1921. It is also significant because of its fine medieval and Arts and Crafts design.

The structure has been refurbished into office space. As of 2008, tenants include the Detroit-Wayne County Port Authority and  Friends of Belle Isle. It had undergone  extensive restoration and renovation from 2018 to 2022. The house is known for its original painted glass windows and moraivan tile work and pewabic fireplace. It was opened on June 11, 2022 as a historic inn with an speakeasy downstairs. It has a large collection of oil paintings and antique furniture.

References

External links
Detroit-Wayne County Port Authority
Friends of Belle Isle

Houses in Detroit
Houses on the National Register of Historic Places in Michigan
Houses completed in 1902
National Register of Historic Places in Detroit